Remember to Live is an EP by American rock band Flyleaf and released after the tour supporting their previously released album Memento Mori.
The album consists of songs that fans have requested to be recorded for years, therefore the album was created especially for them.  There are a few new songs the fans may have never heard and old ones reborn that fans will remember from when Flyleaf was first named "Passerby".

Track listing

Track notes
"Believe In Dreams" and "Amy Says" are re-worked demos that were originally written in the mid-2000s, before the release of Flyleaf's debut album.
"Okay" was written in 2005 and often performed live before their song "Tina".
"Justice and Mercy" is a track from Much Like Falling EP. The "Violent Love Version" is an acoustic version.
"Dear My Closest Friend" is a song from Flyleaf's early days when they were called Passerby. It had never been released to the public.
Ben Moody, a guitarist for the band We Are The Fallen and ex-guitarist/co-founder of Evanescence, remixed "Arise" for Flyleaf's EP. The original version of "Arise" can be found on the band's album Memento Mori.

Chart performance

Personnel

Band
Lacey Mosley – lead vocals
Sameer Bhattacharya – lead guitar
Jared Hartmann – rhythm guitar
James Culpepper – drums, percussion, timpani, and wind chimes
Pat Seals – bass

References

2010 EPs
Flyleaf (band) albums
A&M Octone Records EPs